The following is a list of crossings of the Minnesota River. The Minnesota River is a tributary of the Mississippi River, approximately 332 miles (534 km) long, in the U.S. state of Minnesota. It drains a watershed of nearly 17,000 square miles (44,000 km2), 14,751 square miles (38,200 km2) in Minnesota and about 2,000 sq mi (5,200 km2) in South Dakota and Iowa. It rises in southwestern Minnesota, in Big Stone Lake on the Minnesota–South Dakota border just south of the Laurentian Divide at the Traverse Gap portage. It flows southeast to Mankato, then turns northeast. It joins the Mississippi south of the Twin Cities of Minneapolis and St. Paul, near the historic Fort Snelling.

Crossings

Minnesota River
Crossings of the Minnesota River